The Lockdown Hauntings is a 2021 British horror film written and directed by Howard J. Ford and starring Tony Todd and Angela Dixon.

Plot
During the COVID-19 lockdown in England, as we see aerial shots of eerily deserted streets, a number of women living alone and reaching out remotely to others via Zoom begin to wonder if their isolation might be making them imagine things. Unexplained things keep happening around them, like voices out of nowhere, and household items breaking on their own. This is because, as occult investigator Jordan Myers informs people viewing his online videos tells us, pandemic isolation mimics being alone inside a haunted house, creating conditions for ghosts to emerge. When some of the women begin getting mysteriously murdered, a female police detective named George Parker, who is also isolated and working from home, begins to investigate, and discovers the cause is the ghost a serial killer that had terrorized the area years before.

Before the final credits come up, on-screen text says, "This film was shot during the first UK lockdown for COVID-19 ... by one man."

Cast
Tony Todd as Jordan Myers
Angela Dixon as George Parker
Justin Hayward as Alex Briggs
Heather Peace as Rachel Parker
Jon Campling as Doctor Clarke
Sarah-Jane Potts as Nicola's Mum
Megan Tremethick as Angelina Hale
August Porter as Cindy

Production
Evolution Pictures is a finance company and genre-movie production company whose worldwide sales are through GFM Film Sales. Evolution CEO Fred Hedman, the movie's producer, said the film was shot without COVID-19 insurance: “We were taking the risk, and our financier Head Gear Films took that risk with us." In December 2020, while still in post-productions, the film was picked up for UK distribution by Altitude.

Discussing the production, writer-director Howard J. Ford said, "I quickly realised that if I was going to pull this film off during lockdown, I would not be able to have anyone with me at all. That and staying two metres away from any actors it was really a challenge. Firstly, I needed to find out if actors would let me film in their homes and a social media post gave me my answers and who was up for it. Then I picked what I felt were the absolute best cast from that." Explaining how he was able to cast horror icon Tony Todd on such a small, low-budget film, Ford said:

Release
The film was released in the United Kingdom and Ireland on 3 May 2021. In the United States, it was scheduled to be available On-Demand on 19 October 2021 and on DVD 16 November 2021.

Reception

Rich Cross of Starburst magazine awarded the film two stars. Ian Sedensky of Culture Crypt dismissed the movie as "scatterbrained claptrap that is dull as dirt," criticizing "a cast list overstuffed with a whopping 34 characters, which is about 20 too many for what should be a straightforward mystery." The "exposition jumps all over the place" and "it's impossible to tell anyone apart thanks to nearly everyone being blondes with no distinct features or known backstories." Archi Sengupta of Leisure Byte called it a "very cash-grabby attempt at a movie" and said "the biggest flaw is the story. It's pretty bad. The central theme itself is kinda hilarious and the execution does no favours." Still, despite "a very small budget and a skeleton cast ... the cinematography is pretty great and the movie looks very artsy most of the time."

John Higgins of Film and TV Now, called it "A modern horror gem" and said it "harks back to the truly spooky elements that defined many a classic mainstream and indie offering, coupled with classic British genre TV like 'Children of the Stones' and 'Hammer House of Horror." The review said Dixon "invests the right balance of courage and vulnerability."

References

External links
 
  Video interview

2021 films
British horror films
Films about the COVID-19 pandemic
Media depictions of the COVID-19 pandemic in the United Kingdom
2020s English-language films
2020s British films